Megachile heteroptera is a species of bee in the family Megachilidae. It was described by Sichel in 1867.

References

Heteroptera
Insects described in 1867